Nieuwpoort is a city and municipality located in Flanders, one of the three regions of Belgium, and in the Flemish province of West Flanders. The municipality comprises the town of Nieuwpoort proper and the settlements of Ramskapelle and Sint-Joris. On 1 January 2008, Nieuwpoort had a total population of 11,062. The total area is 31.00 km² which gives a population density of 350 inhabitants per km². The current mayor of Nieuwpoort is Geert Vanden Broucke (CD&V)

In Nieuwpoort, the Yser flows into the North Sea. It was also the home of a statue created by Jan Fabre called Searching for Utopia. The Stadshalle Grain Hall (market hall) with its belfry was inscribed on the UNESCO World Heritage List in 1999 as part of the Belfries of Belgium and France site, owing to its historical civic (not religious) importance and its architecture.

History

It obtained city rights in 1163 from Count Philip of Flanders. The Battle of Nieuwpoort, between the Dutch and the Spanish, happened here in 1600. The city was a Dunkirker base. Painter Victor Boucquet made two of the altar-pieces for the great church in the 17th century. The city was occupied by French forces for six years between 1757 and 1763, as part of the conditions of the Second Treaty of Versailles between France and Austria. A large waterworks infrastructure project called the Ganzepoot (goose foot, in Dutch) was constructed in Nieuwpoort in the 19th century to drain the polders and channel water in and around the town and to the North Sea.
  

During the Battle of the Yser, part of the First Battle of Ypres in World War I, Hendrik Geeraert opened the sluice gates on the mouth of the river Yser twice to flood the lower lying land, thus halting the German advance. Two World War I monuments, the Nieuport Memorial and King Albert I Memorial, are in close proximity of the Ganzepoot.

Towns
The old city centre of Nieuwpoort is located about three kilometers from the coast. Close to the sea, a new tourist centre has developed. Both parts form one contiguous built up area, connected by buildings along the Albert I Laan street and the fishing port. Besides Nieuwpoort proper, two small villages in the Flemish polders are part of the municipality, Sint-Joris and Ramskapelle.

Nieuwpoort is located by the sea. At the coastal line, it borders the municipalities Koksijde at its town Oostduinkerke and Middelkerke at its town Lombardsijde. Because the territory of the town of Ramskapelle expands far inland, Nieuwpoort has a large number of neighbouring towns, most of which are part of 2 large municipalities:

a. Lombardsijde (Middelkerke)
b. Westende (Middelkerke)
c. Slijpe (Middelkerke)
d. Mannekensvere (Middelkerke)
e. Schore (Middelkerke)
f. Pervijze (Diksmuide)
g. Veurne
h. Booitshoeke (Veurne)
i. Wulpen (Koksijde)
j. Oostduinkerke (Koksijde)

In literature
Part of the plot in Cecelia Holland's historical novel The Sea Beggars is laid in Nieuwpoort, in the preliminary states of the Eighty Years' War - with the sailor protagonists feeling oppressed under the harsh Spanish rule and eventually joining the rebellious Watergeuzen.

See also
Operation Hush

References

External links

 - Mainly in Dutch, some info available in French and English
Startpage of Nieuwpoort  - Alle site's binnen Nieuwpoort
Illustrated Article on Nieupoort & the Yser Front during WW1 at 'Battlefields Europe'

 
Municipalities of West Flanders
Port cities and towns in Belgium
Port cities and towns of the North Sea
Seaside resorts in Belgium